Robert Richard Hieronimus (born 1943) is an educator, artist, author, activist and has been an acknowledged pioneer in the "New Paradigm" movement since 1971.

Early years and education
Hieronimus fits the definition of a "visionary artist" in that he did not attend art school. His B.S. degree is in teaching from Towson State Teacher's College (now Towson University) and he taught art for two years to grade school children. In the late 1960s Hieronimus traveled with Elektra Records and recording artists such as Jimi Hendrix, the Doors, and Janis Joplin to design posters and album covers and share info on esoterica. In 1969 he co-founded AUM, the first state-approved school of esoteric studies in the country which granted certificates in the occult sciences, mystic arts and religious metaphysics. PBS documented his leadership and contributions in 1971 with the feature, "The Artist of Savitria" produced by Maryland Public Television and seen nationwide. He continued his study of ancient cultures and symbolism independently, with a particular emphasis on the founding of America. In 1981, Hieronimus was awarded a Ph.D. from Saybrook Graduate School for his doctoral thesis, "An Historic Analysis of the Reverse of the American Great Seal and Its Relationship to the Ideology of Humanistic Psychology."

Murals
Hieronimus has a long career as a muralist and painter. His occult and symbolic murals include the  prophetic Apocalypse completed during 1968–1969 at the Johns Hopkins University, which led to Hieronimus being called "one of this country's best muralists". The Historic Views of Baltimore 1752–1858 mural was completed in 1976 and is housed in the War Memorial Building Baltimore, Maryland. Art historian and critic Alan Barnet noted, "Hieronimus has a talent for winning the cooperation of the establishment while he lives and works in the counter-culture."

The Great Seal of America and U.S. symbolism
Hieronimus's research on the Great Seal has been used in the speeches, literature, and libraries of the White House (1976, 1982), the State Department (1978), and the Department of Interior (1982). His Independence Hall speech on the Great Seal's bicentennial was published in the Congressional Record (1983, 1984), and his research was shared in a personal meeting with the late Egyptian President Anwar El-Sadat. Together with his wife, Zohara Meyerhoff Hieronimus, Robert Hieronimus lobbied the House and Senate on the Great Seal Act (1982–1986). Inner Traditions published a popular version of Hieronimus's doctoral thesis in 1989, entitled America's Secret Destiny: Spiritual Vision and the Founding of a Nation. This book was revised and expanded in 2006 under the title Founding Fathers, Secret Societies: Freemasons, Illuminati, Rosicrucians and the Decoding of the Great Seal. As a result of this book, Dr. Bob was featured on documentaries on the National Geographic, Discovery and History Channels. Founding Fathers, Secret Societies has been translated into German, French, Russian, and Spanish.

In 2008, New Page Books released his book, United Symbolism of America: Deciphering Hidden Meanings in America's Most Familiar Art, Architecture and Logos, an account of how the Statue of Liberty, the Liberty Bell, the flag, the eagle, the Great Seal, and Washington, D.C., became American icons. Each is examined from a humanistic psychological point of view with interpretations from world cultures, religions, secret societies, archetypes and popular usage. Hieronimus takes a position contrary to growing anti-American sentiment. This book was turned into a 2-hour special on the Discovery Channel called Secret America, a special on the History Channel called Secrets of the Founding Fathers, and was featured in a segment on Canada's Vision TV called "Occult Architecture: Washington DC."

The Woodstock Bus

Hieronimus's most famous Artcar, the Volkswagen bus "Light" (better known as "the Woodstock bus"), was photographed by the Associated Press and Rolling Stone at the original 1969 Woodstock, and is still seen today regularly reprinted in media all over the world. A diecast model of Hieronimus’s painted Woodstock bus was produced by Sunstar Diecast in 2009 in recognition of Woodstock's 40th anniversary. As seen in The Baltimore Sun.

Spray Filmes of São Paulo, Brazil came to Owings Mills, Maryland to make a short film about Dr. Bob Hieronimus and his iconic "Woodstock Bus". Spray Filmes was hired by Volkswagen in Brazil and the PR firm ALMA BBDO to create and present some high-class awards to a few select people around the world that they determined had the most touching stories related to the classic VW Kombi bus. At the end of this shorter video interviewing Dr. Bob about his Woodstock Bus and presenting him with the customized Kombi-shaped sketchpad and art kit, you will see the thank-you artwork that Bob made for Kombi that the film crew then took to the Woodstock Museum in Bethel, and donated to them.

This summer, these filmmakers and PR company were honored as their Goodbye Kombi ad campaign received at least seven Lion Awards, including two golds, at the Cannes Lions International Festival of Creativity, the world's most renowned advertising festival.

Artcars
Some of Hieronimus Artcars:

In 2006, Hieronimus transformed his Mercedes 300 SD into the Biodiesel-fueled "Founding Fathers Artcar" – the only Biodiesel Artcar in the state of Maryland and a popular feature in regional parades. In 2008, this car was repainted and renamed to "We the People."

Yellow Submarine 
In 2002, Hieronimus published Inside the Yellow Submarine: The Making of the Beatles Animated Classic, which has been called "an indispensable companion to the movie." The companion volume It's All in the Mind: Inside The Beatles' Yellow Submarine vol. 2 was published in 2021. His perspective on Yellow Submarine is unique in that it includes interviews with all the principle creators of the original film as well as a symbolic and archetypal analysis of this classic film. In March–April 2005, Dr. Bob Hieronimus was invited to speak on a panel of Yellow Submarine experts after the screening of "Yellow Submarine" during the first Abbey Road Film Festival at this legendary Beatles location. He spent many of his off-duty hours drawing a six-foot mural of the Yellow Sub on the outside wall of Abbey Road Studios. Hieronimus continues to uncover new information on this film and in 2008 for the 40th anniversary published several new articles for various Beatles and animation magazines with new information discovered since the publication of Inside the Yellow Submarine.

Negro league baseball

Robert Hieronimus and Zohara Meyerhoff Hieronimus champion environmental and social causes including supporting the Negro league baseball players who suffered racial discrimination. Serving on the Negro League Baseball Players Association (NLBPA) Board of Directors, they were instrumental in arranging for representatives of the NLBPA to participate at a lecture and reception for Black History Month in the East Room of The White House. President George Bush said, "Let me single out, as a fan, the representatives of the Negro League Baseball Players Association."

After being almost forgotten for thirty years after the Negro leagues were completely absorbed by Major League Baseball, this presidential honor was particularly poignant. On Feb. 8, 1994 Vice President Al Gore once again welcomed a representative team of nine Negro league baseball veterans and the Hieronimuses to a Black History Month White House Ceremony.

Additionally, the Hieronimuses are friends of the Leon Day family and were instrumental for Day being nominated to the Baseball Hall of Fame.

21st Century Radio
Hieronimus has been a frequent guest on radio and television talk shows across the country since 1967 sharing his research in metaphysical symbolism, the founding fathers, America's Great Seal, UFOs and the paranormal, and even synchronistic methods for picking winning lottery numbers.

In January 1988 Dr. Bob launched 21st Century Radio, first on WFBR in Baltimore, then on over 100 stations nationwide on the American Radio Network and currently on WCBM 680 in Baltimore, Maryland USA Sunday nights 8–10 pm Eastern. He interviews leading-edge authorities on their unusual findings or opinions with his easy-going blend of humor, well-read background and passion for mythology. Hieronimus seasons his programming with visits from cultural heroes and icons who help add humor and inspiration to the sometimes discouraging news of the future.

In 1990 Dr. Bob and Zoh incorporated Hieronimus & Co., Inc. to serve as a media research service, providing story and guest ideas and materials to television, newspapers and radio worldwide.

References

1943 births
Living people
American muralists
Towson University alumni
Artists from Baltimore